Upernavik Field is a multi-purpose venue in Upernavik, Greenland. It is currently used mostly for football matches.

References

Football venues in Greenland
Multi-purpose stadiums in Greenland